Endo-beta-galactosidase may refer to:
 Blood-group-substance endo-1,4-beta-galactosidase
 Keratan-sulfate endo-1,4-beta-galactosidase